The California Intercollegiate Baseball Association was a college baseball association that competed under the Pacific Coast Conference, much like a 'division' in modern-day college athletic conferences.  The association was formed in 1927 by Southern California, California, Saint Mary's College of California, Santa Clara  and Stanford.  The CIBA lasted until 1966.  Member schools also included at various times Loyola Marymount University, UCLA, Occidental College, Pepperdine University, UC Santa Barbara, the University of San Francisco, and Whittier College.

References

Pac-12 Conference baseball
College baseball leagues in the United States
Baseball leagues in California
Defunct baseball leagues in the United States
Sports leagues established in 1927
1927 establishments in California
1966 disestablishments in California